A bandit is a person who engages in banditry.

Bandit, The Bandit or Bandits may also refer to:

Arts and entertainment

Film and television
 A Bandit, a 1913 short film starring Fatty Arbuckle
 The Bandit (1946 film), an Italian drama originally titled Il Bandito
 The Bandit (1996 film), a Turkish drama originally titled Eşkıya
 Bandits (1997 film), a German film directed by Katja von Garnier
 Bandits (2001 film), an American film directed by Barry Levinson
 Bandit (film), an American film directed by Allan Ungar
 the lead character in the Smokey and the Bandit film franchise, originally played by Burt Reynolds
 Bandit (TV series), a Welsh language music television show
 Bandit, a dog in the animated television series Jonny Quest and The New Adventures of Jonny Quest
 Bandit, the father of the main character in the Australian television preschool series Bluey

Music
The Bandits, an English blues band
Bandits (Belgian band), a Belgian band
Bandit (band), a British rock band
"Bandit" (song), a song by Juice Wrld and YoungBoy Never Broke Again
The Bandit (rapper), an Australian rapper who placed sixth on Australia's Got Talent season 5
The Bandit (album), a 1972 country music album by The Nashville String Band
"The Bandit" (song), a 2021 song by Kings of Leon from their album When You See Yourself

Other
The Bandits (ballet), first presented by the Imperial Ballet in 1875
Bandit (Yomiuriland), a roller coaster in Japan
Bandits: Phoenix Rising, a 2002 racing video game
Donyell Taylor, a Marvel comics mutant superhero known as Night Thrasher or Bandit
 Bandits (book), by Eric Hobsbawm discussing the history of social bandits

Sports teams

United States
Baltimore Bandits, an American Hockey League team from 1995 to 1997
Bay Area Bandits, a Women's Football Alliance team
Bend Bandits, a minor league baseball team based in Bend, Oregon, which played in the independent Western Baseball League from 1995 to 1998
Border City Bandits, a professional ice hockey team from Texarkana, Texas, which played in the Central Hockey League during the 2000–2001 season
Boston Bandits, formerly the Bridgewater Bandits, a Tier III Junior A ice hockey team in the Eastern Hockey League
Buffalo Bandits, a National Lacrosse League team
Chicago Bandits, a women's professional softball team
 Chinese Bandits, a group of football players on the 1958 and 1959 LSU Tigers college team who achieved iconic status
Gulf Coast Bandits, a defunct World Basketball Association team
Jackson Bandits, an ice hockey team in the East Coast Hockey League
Quad Cities River Bandits, a Class A minor league baseball team based in Davenport, Iowa
San Angelo Bandits, a professional indoor football team based in San Angelo, Texas
Sioux City Bandits, a professional indoor football team
St. Louis Bandits (2006-2012) or Texarkana Bandits (2003-2006), a former Tier II Junior A ice hockey team in the North American Hockey League (now the Minnesota Wilderness)
Tampa Bay Bandits, a United States Football League team

Australia
Albury Wodonga Bandits, a South East Australian Basketball League team
Brisbane Bandits, an Australian Baseball League team
Brisbane Bandits (1989–1998), a former Australian Baseball League team

Canada
Brooks Bandits, an Alberta Junior Hockey League team
Burlington Bandits, an independent baseball team based in Burlington, Ontario
Fraser Valley Bandits, a Canadian Elite Basketball League team based in Abbotsford, British Columbia
Cumberland Bandits, a National Capital Junior Hockey League team based in Cumberland, Ontario
Lloydminster Bandits, a North Eastern Alberta Junior B Hockey League team

Elsewhere
Belmopan Bandits, a football team in the Premier League of Belize
Berwick Bandits, a speedway team in the British Premier League
Rhein-Neckar Bandits, an American football team based in Mannheim, Germany
West Bandits Solo, an Indonesian basketball team

Motorcycling
A member of the Bandidos Motorcycle Club
Suzuki Bandit series, a Suzuki motorcycle series
Triumph Bandit, a 1970 British motorcycle prototype

People
Daniel James Bandit (born 1980), better known as Ghostshrimp, American graphic artist
Harry Gant (born 1940), NASCAR driver nicknamed "the Bandit"
Bandit (drag queen)

Other uses
The NATO brevity code for an enemy aircraft
Redbanded rockfish, a species of fish also called bandit
Bandit.fm, a former online music store operated by Sony Corporation
KRFN, a commercial radio station in Reno, Nevada, branded 100.9 The Bandit
Bandit Radio or Bandit 105.5, one of the first commercial broadcasting radio stations in Sweden
RSS Bandit, an open source RSS/Atom aggregator based on the Microsoft .NET framework
Multi-armed bandit, a problem in probability theory

See also
Bhandit Thongdee, a Thai film director, screenwriter and producer
Bandito (disambiguation)